Brian Boyer (born October 24, 1969) is a former American college basketball coach.

Boyer was the head coach women's basketball coach at Arkansas State University for 20 years and compiled an overall record of 333-287. He won more games than any coach (men's or women's) in the school's history.

Early life and education
Boyer was born in Memphis, Missouri, a small farming community in the Northern part of the state. He attended Missouri Western where he earned a bachelor's degree in Physical Education in 1993.

Coaching career

Missouri Western
Upon arriving at Missouri Western as a student, Boyer began working as assistant with the men's program in 1989 and moved to assistant with the men's program in 1993.

During his time at Missouri Western, the Griffons made five NCAA Division II appearances (1990, 1991, 1992, 1994 and 1995) and captured two conference championships and advanced to the Sweet 16 in 1990 while with the men's program.

After moving into his role with the women's program, Missouri Western and Boyer continued their joint success as the program made two NCAA Tournament appearances, including a trip to the Elite Eight in 1994 and a Final Four berth in 1995.

Arkansas State
In 1995, Boyer arrived at Arkansas State as an assistant under Jeff Mittie, who is the current head coach of the Kansas State Wildcats. Upon Mittie's departure in August 1999 to become the head coach at TCU, Boyer was promoted to the position of head coach.

In his first season as head coach in 1999–2000, Boyer guided A-State to an 18-12 overall record and a second straight trip to the Women's National Invitation Tournament.

His teams returned to the postseason in 2003–04 and 2004–05, both of which resulted in appearances in the WNIT. During the 2005 tournament, A-State hosted Arkansas at the Convocation Center in front of the largest crowd in arena history at 10,892. A-State won the game 98-84 and advanced to quarterfinals where the squad fell to Iowa. In 2013–14 Boyer's teams began a run of three consecutive WNIT berths that also included two regular season Sun Belt Conference championships. During the run the Red Wolves played in the Sun Belt Conference championship game twice and compiled 75 wins during the span.

The 2013–14 season proved to be one of major significance for Boyer as he became the Sun Belt Conference's all-time leader in league victories, passing former La Tech coach Leon Barmore and former Florida International coach Cindy Russo who each had 136 wins on the sidelines.

Arkansas State missed the NCAA Tournament in 2014–15 despite compiling a record of 23-10 during the regular season. A-State also missed the NCAA Tournament at the end of 2015–16 season despite an 18-game winning streak and a 26-5 record during the regular season.

During the run, Boyer won two Sun Belt Conference Coach of the Year honors and helped Aundrea Gamble become the first player in league history to win three consecutive Student-Athlete of the Year honors.

Coaching record

References

External links
 Coach Boyer's Bio

1969 births
Living people
American women's basketball coaches
Arkansas State Red Wolves women's basketball coaches
Basketball coaches from Missouri
Missouri Western State University alumni
People from Memphis, Missouri